Kutsukake (written: 沓掛) is a Japanese surname. Notable people with the surname include:

, Japanese politician
, Japanese footballer

Fictional characters
 a character from a novel and several films including Kutsukake Tokijirō (1954 film)

See also
Kutsukake Station, a railway station in Shima, Mie Prefecture, Japan
Kutsukake-shuku, a station of the Nakasendō

Japanese-language surnames